Travis Steven Baptist (born December 30, 1971) is a retired Major League Baseball pitcher.

On December 9, 1996, he was drafted by the Minnesota Twins from the Toronto Blue Jays organization in the minor league portion of the 1996 Rule 5 draft. While Baptist was a member of the Salt Lake Buzz in 1998, he was chosen as the starting pitcher for the Pacific Coast League team in the Triple-A All Star game.

Baptist went on to later play his only season at the major league level with the Twins in 1998.

References

External links

 Pelota Binaria (Venezuelan Winter League)

1971 births
Living people
Baseball players from Oregon
Birmingham Barons players
Cardenales de Lara players
American expatriate baseball players in Venezuela
Charlotte Knights players
Major League Baseball pitchers
Medicine Hat Blue Jays players
Minnesota Twins players
Myrtle Beach Hurricanes players
Nashua Pride players
Nashville Sounds players
New Britain Rock Cats players
Pawtucket Red Sox players
People from Forest Grove, Oregon
Rio Grande Valley WhiteWings players
Salt Lake Buzz players
Syracuse Chiefs players
Mat-Su Miners players
Brother Elephants players
American expatriate baseball players in Taiwan